Mattias Alkberg (born January 8, 1969), sometimes known as Matti Alkberg, is a Swedish poet, songwriter and musician. He has released four poetry books and more than a dozen records with his two bands The Bear Quartet and Mattias Alkberg BD.

Books
1992: Separerade Ägg (Wahlström & Widstrand)
1997: Röda Stjärna (Wahlström & Widstrand)
2000: Jag var en av er (Wahlström & Widstrand)
2004: Göta Kanal (Wahlström & Widstrand)
2011: Era Svin (Wahlström & Widstrand)

Discography
Solo
2009: Nerverna (Ny Våg)
2011: Allt det här (Split album with Pascal)
2011: Anarkist (Ny Våg)
2013: Mattias Alkberg begravning	
2014: Södra Sverige
2015: Personer

Mattias Alkberg BD
2004: Tunaskolan
2005: Jag ska bli en bättre vän (A West Side Fabrication)
2006: Ditt hjärta är en stjärna (A West Side Fabrication)

The Bear Quartet
1992: Penny Century (A West Side Fabrication)
1993: Cosy Den (A West Side Fabrication)
1993: Family Affair (A West Side Fabrication)
1995: Everybody Else (A West Side Fabrication)
1995: Holy Holy (A West Side Fabrication)
1997: Moby Dick (A West Side Fabrication)
1998: Personality Crisis (A West Side Fabrication)
2000: My War (A West Side Fabrication)
2001: Gay Icon (A West Side Fabrication)
2002: Ny våg (A West Side Fabrication)
2003: Early Years (A West Side Fabrication)
2003: Angry Brigade (A West Side Fabrication)
2005: Saturday Night (A West Side Fabrication)
2006: Eternity Now (A West Side Fabrication)
2009: 89 (A West Side Fabrication)
2010: Monty Python (A West Side Fabrication)

References

Swedish male singers
Swedish guitarists
Male guitarists
Living people
Swedish male writers
The Bear Quartet members
1969 births